The Burnham committee – properly the Burnham Primary and Secondary and Burnham Further Education Committees – was responsible for setting teachers' pay in the United Kingdom.

The committees were established by H. A. L. Fisher in 1919 when he was President of the Board of Education. On each committee there was a Teachers' Panel on which places were allocated to the various teachers unions in proportion to their membership, and an Employers' Panel.  The committees were abolished by the Teachers' Pay and Conditions Act 1987. The Teachers Panel for Primary and Secondary Education was dominated by the National Union of Teachers.  The National Association of Schoolmasters was not represented until 1961.

The archives of official papers of the Burnham Committees and their Teachers' Panels are held at Warwick University library.

The committees came to be known informally as "Burnham Committees" after their first chairman, Harry Levy-Lawson, 1st Viscount Burnham, and were officially renamed as such after his death in 1933.

References

Teaching in the United Kingdom
1919 establishments in the United Kingdom
1987 disestablishments in the United Kingdom